Robert Gordon may refer to:

Entertainment
 Robert Gordon (actor) (1895–1971), silent-film actor
 Robert Gordon (director) (1913–1990), American director
 Robert Gordon (singer) (1947–2022), American rockabilly singer
 Robert Gordon (screenwriter), American screenwriter
 Robert Gordon (writer and filmmaker), American author and director
 Robert Gordon, British record producer, member of the Forgemasters

Military
 Robert Gordon (RAF officer) (1882–1954), British officer
 Robert MacIntyre Gordon (1899–1983), Scottish World War I flying ace
 Robert Gordon (British Army officer) (born 1950), British general

Politics
 Sir Robert Gordon, 1st Baronet (1580–1656), Scottish courtier and historian
 Sir Robert Gordon, 3rd Baronet (1647–1704), Scottish courtier and politician
 Sir Robert Gordon, 4th Baronet (1696–1772), Scottish landowner and politician
 Robert Gordon (MP) (1786–1864), British Member of Parliament for Windsor and Cricklade
 Robert Gordon (diplomat) (1791–1847), British diplomat
 Robert B. Gordon (1855–1923), U.S. Representative from Ohio
 Robert Gordon (Vermont politician) (1865–1921), mayor of Barre 1916–1917
 Robert C. F. Gordon (1920–2001), American diplomat
 Robert M. Gordon (born 1950), New Jersey state senator
 Robert Gordon (ambassador) (born 1952), British ambassador to Burma and to Vietnam

Sports
 Robert Gordon (rower) (1830–1914), English rower and clergyman
 Robert Gordon (cricketer) (1889–1914), New Zealand cricketer
 Robert Gordon (English footballer) (1917–1940), British footballer and soldier
 Robert Gordon (gridiron football) (born 1968), American football player
 Robert Gordon (Scottish footballer), Scottish footballer for Dumbarton during the 1900s
 Rob Gordon (born 1975), New Zealand rugby player
 Rob Gordon (curler), Canadian curler
 Robb Gordon, Canadian hockey player
 Robby Gordon (born 1969), American racing driver

Professors
 R. K. Gordon (1887–1973), medieval literature professor at University of Alberta
 Robert Winslow Gordon (1888–1961), folklore professor at Berkeley
 Robert Aaron Gordon (1908–1978), economics professor at Berkeley
 Robert A. Gordon (born 1932), sociology professor at Johns Hopkins
 Robert J. Gordon (born 1940), economics professor at Northwestern
 Robert P. Gordon (born 1945), professor of Hebrew at Cambridge
 Robert Gordon (academic) (born 1966), Italian studies professor at Cambridge

Other
 Robert Gordon of Lochinvar (died 1628) Scottish landowner and promoter of colonies in Canada
 Robert Gordon of Straloch (1580–1661), Scottish cartographer
 Robert Gordon (philanthropist) (1668–1731), Scottish trader and philanthropist
 Robert Jacob Gordon (1743–1795), Dutch explorer of South Africa
 Robert Gordon (minister) (1786–1853), Free Church of Scotland minister 
 Robert Gordon (banker) (1829–1918), founder of the Metropolitan Museum of Art
 Robert Gordon (psychologist) (born 1944), American
 Robert L. Gordon III (born 1957), American business executive
 Robert J. Gordon (lawyer), American trial lawyer

See also
 Bob Gordon (disambiguation)
 Robert Gordon University, Aberdeen, Scotland
 Robert Gordon's College, Aberdeen, Scotland
 Roberts-Gordon LLC, HVAC manufacturer